David Matthew Warsofsky (born May 30, 1990) is an American professional ice hockey defenseman. He is currently playing with Augsburger Panther of the Deutsche Eishockey Liga (DEL).

Early life
Warsofsky is Jewish, and was born in Marshfield, Massachusetts, the son of Dawn and Mark Warsofsky.

He played at Marshfield High School in 2004–05 and at Cushing Academy in Ashburnham, Massachusetts for the following two years. He was named the 2007 U.S. Hockey Report's Prep Defenseman of the Year. Warsofsky was captain of the 2007–08 Under-18 United States men's national ice hockey team, where he tied as leader in assists and was second in points. The team won a bronze medal at the 2008 IIHF World U18 Championship.

Playing career

Warsofsky was selected by the St. Louis Blues in the 4th round (95th overall) of the 2008 NHL Entry Draft. Instead of turning pro immediately, he played for Boston University in the Hockey East and was a member of the 2009 national championship team as a freshman. He played for Team USA in 2010, winning the World Junior Ice Hockey Championships.

On June 26, 2010, the Blues traded Warsofsky's rights to the Boston Bruins in exchange for Vladimír Sobotka. He then played four consecutive seasons solely for the Bruins' American Hockey League (AHL) affiliate, the Providence Bruins.

On December 18, 2013, the Bruins recalled Warsofsky from Providence. He is the first Bruin to wear the number 79. He made his NHL debut the following night in a 4–2 loss to the Buffalo Sabres. On December 28, Warsofsky scored his first career NHL goal in a 4–3 loss to the Ottawa Senators. He finished the season with two points in six games for Boston, as well as 32 in 56 with Providence.

On July 1, 2015, Warsofsky signed a one-year, two-way contract with the Pittsburgh Penguins. He skated in 12 games for the Penguins during the 2015–16 season, recording one goal. On February 26, 2016, the New Jersey Devils claimed Warsofsky off waivers. He finished the season with one assist in ten games for the Devils.

On July 1, 2016, Warsofsky returned to the Penguins, signing a one-year, two-way contract. He spent the majority of the 2016–17 season with Wilkes-Barre, where he led all team defensemen with 47 points in 58 contests, all career-highs. He also skated in seven games with Pittsburgh, recording one assist.

On July 1, 2017, Warsofsky signed a two-year contract with the Colorado Avalanche. Aside from a 16-game stint with the Avalanche in the 2017–18 season, he primarily played for the team's affiliate's (the San Antonio Rampage and the Colorado Eagles).

On July 1, 2019, Warsofsky returned to the Penguins for a second time, signing a two-year, two-way contract. He was named captain of Wilkes-Barre/Scranton, and led the defense with 33 points in 51 games.

On August 25, 2020, Warsofsky was traded by the Penguins to the Toronto Maple Leafs along with Evan Rodrigues, Filip Hallander, and the 15th overall pick in the 2020 NHL Entry Draft in exchange for Kasperi Kapanen, Jesper Lindgren and Pontus Aberg.

On February 15, 2021, Warsofsky was traded to the Carolina Hurricanes along with Yegor Korshkov in exchange for Alex Galchenyuk. In the  season, Warsofsky was assigned by the Hurricanes to join AHL affiliate, the Chicago Wolves, to be coached by his brother Ryan. Limited to 22 regular season games, he produced 17 assists and 19 points.

As a free agent from the Hurricanes, Warsofsky left North America by signing his first contract abroad, agreeing to a one-year contract with German club ERC Ingolstadt of the DEL on June 18, 2021.

Career statistics

Regular season and playoffs

International

Awards and honours

See also
 List of select Jewish ice hockey players

References

External links
 
Twitter page

1990 births
Living people
American men's ice hockey defensemen
Augsburger Panther players
Boston Bruins players
Boston University Terriers men's ice hockey players
Chicago Wolves players
Colorado Avalanche players
Colorado Eagles players
ERC Ingolstadt players
Jewish ice hockey players
Jewish American sportspeople
People from Marshfield, Massachusetts
Sportspeople from Plymouth County, Massachusetts
New Jersey Devils players
Ice hockey players from Massachusetts
Ice hockey players at the 2022 Winter Olympics
Olympic ice hockey players of the United States
Pittsburgh Penguins players
Providence Bruins players
St. Louis Blues draft picks
San Antonio Rampage players
USA Hockey National Team Development Program players
Wilkes-Barre/Scranton Penguins players